Thomas Ramos (born May 27, 1992) is an American soccer player who currently plays for Albuquerque Sol FC in the USL Premier Development League. In 2013, he played for the Phoenix FC Wolves in their single season of existence.  Ramos played soccer at the collegiate level for the Cal State Northridge Matadors.

References

External links
 USL Pro profile

1992 births
Living people
American soccer players
Cal State Northridge Matadors men's soccer players
Phoenix FC players
FC Tucson players
USL Championship players
USL League Two players
Soccer players from Arizona
Association football midfielders